Charles Henry Bromby (11 July 181414 April 1907) was the Anglican Bishop of Tasmania from 1864 to 1882.  


Early life
Bromby was the second son of John Healey Bromby (a priest) and brother of John Edward Bromby. He was born in Hull, England. He was educated at Hull Grammar School, Uppingham School and St John's College, Cambridge, where he graduated BA in 1837 with third-class honours in classics, MA in 1840 and DD in 1864.

Career
Bromby was made deacon in Lichfield in 1838 and served as curate at Chesterfield from 1838 to 1839; and was ordained priest in 1839 in York and was headmaster of Stepney Grammar School from 1839.
In 1843 Bromby was appointed vicar at St Paul's, Cheltenham, and was joint-founder and principal of the Cheltenham training college for teachers  1843–1864. He published The Sorrows of Bethany and other Sermons (1846), which was followed by The Pupil Teacher's English Grammar (1848), and a volume on Liturgy and Church History (1852), the third edition of this appeared in 1862 under the title of Church Students' Manual. In 1864 he was appointed Bishop of Tasmania, the last Colonial bishop to be nominated by the crown, and was consecrated on St Peter's day 1864, by Charles Longley, Archbishop of Canterbury at Canterbury Cathedral. In 1868, when the question of the abolishing of state aid to religion was dealt with, Bromby was largely responsible for the passing of the commutation act which resulted in the Church of England in Tasmania receiving about £60,000 as a perpetual endowment instead of the former yearly payments. Early in 1869 a contract was made for the building of the nave of St David's cathedral, and the cathedral was consecrated in 1874, Bromby himself acting as Dean from 1874 to 1876. In 1880 he visited England, and in 1882 resigned his see. His episcopate was marked by the building of several new churches and a great increase in the number of clergy.

Bromby returned to England and became rector of Shrawardine-cum-Montford (1882–1887), and assistant-bishop of Lichfield (1882–1891). He was also warden of St John's Hospital, Lichfield (1887–1891). He then became assistant Bishop of Bath and Wells until he resigned in 1900 at the age of 86. He lived in retirement with his son, Henry Bromby, at Clifton, and died there on 14 April 1907.

Legacy
Bromby also published several sermons and addresses in pamphlet form. He married in 1839 Mary Anne, daughter of a Dr Bodley of Brighton, and there were several children. The eldest son, Henry Bodley Bromby (1840–1911) became dean of Hobart in 1876, and the second son Charles Hamilton was in the Tasmanian government. The Tasmanian synod founded a studentship in Bromby's memory in 1910.

References

Herbert H. Condon, 'Bromby, Charles Henry (1814 - 1907)', Australian Dictionary of Biography, Volume 3, MUP, 1969, pp 240–241.

External links

 

1814 births
1907 deaths
People from Kingston upon Hull
Anglican bishops of Tasmania
People educated at Hull Grammar School
Linguists of English
19th-century English Anglican priests
Alumni of St John's College, Cambridge
Australian Anglican bishops